The Azul River is a river in Rio Grande do Sul in southern Brazil. It is a right tributary of the Palomas River.

See also
List of rivers of Rio Grande do Sul

References

Rivers of Rio Grande do Sul